Miriam Weeks, known by her stage name of Belle Knox, is an American former pornographic film actress. She is known for performing in pornography while studying at Duke University.

Knox started doing pornography in 2013 to help pay for her $60,000 per year tuition costs.  In late 2013, her career became publicly known on campus, and she faced extensive in-person and online harassment.  Knox took a college-sanctioned break from Duke University in early 2014 and later returned to continue her studies.

Knox has publicly defended her decision to do the work, as well as explained her views of feminism and rights for sex workers.  She believes her experiences are indicative of the rising costs of higher education in the United States.

Knox has won a 2014 Fanny Award and a 2015 XBIZ Award.

Career 
Knox decided to enter the pornography industry because she enjoyed sex and pornography, and the job offered much better compensation and working hours.  In previous work as a waitress, Knox had a boss who treated her poorly and a schedule that interfered with her studies, for less than $400 a month (after taxes).  Pornography would allow her to control her schedule, and she could make about $1,300 per scene. Knox had previously tried to apply for government loans, but was told that she was ineligible; and believed private student loans would "strap her family with debt".

She began working in pornography in November 2013, flying out to Los Angeles while on school breaks to perform in the films. Knox chose the name "Belle", inspired by Belle from Beauty and the Beast and the character of Belle from Secret Diary of a Call Girl; the name "Knox" is after Amanda Knox, exonerated in the murder of Meredith Kercher. In early 2015 Knox declined to comment on whether she was still filming adult movies.

Political activism
Weeks was a College Republican and considers herself a sex-positive feminist and libertarian. She identifies her "favorite figures in liberty" as Ayn Rand, economist Milton Friedman, and two other activists whose careers have included both sex and politics: porn actress Nina Hartley and former call girl Maggie McNeill. She has also shown admiration for both former Representative Ron Paul and his son Senator Rand Paul.

She was involved in the organization Students for Liberty, an organization that bills itself as "the largest libertarian student organization in the world", and was the campus coordinator for Students for Liberty at Duke. In addition to her work with Students for Liberty, Weeks said she was appointed to the national board of directors for the Sex Workers Outreach Project. Knox had been asked to speak in Duke classes about being a sex worker, and has given speeches at other colleges besides her alma mater.

While her work in porn helped fuel her political beliefs, Weeks says she began developing her ideology earlier in life. "I grew up Catholic, so I grew up in a very, very, conservative background and that, I think, really was kind of the impetus for why I wanted to become a libertarian. I was always being told to cover up my body and I was always being told to wait until marriage to have sex, that my body would go down if I didn't wait till marriage to have sex", Weeks explained, adding, "That really made me become a libertarian and become a feminist."

Outing and harassment
On January 10, 2014, fellow Duke student Thomas Bagley revealed Knox's career to his fraternity brothers.  Accounts of how Bagley deduced Knox's identity vary: Bagley claims that Knox revealed her work to him as a secret, whereas Knox claims that Bagley recognized her from watching porn in which she starred.  The news quickly spread through the community.

After returning to campus from winter break, Knox discovered that her personal Facebook account had received more than 230 friend requests.  Fellow students started following her porn persona's Twitter account, at which point she realized that her porn career had been discovered. Shortly thereafter posts began to emerge on the anonymous college discussion board CollegiateACB under the thread title "Freshman Pornstar".  Knox began to receive threats of violence and death in person and via social media sites such as Twitter and Facebook.  Some posters endorsed raping and beating her; others simply wanted Duke to expel Knox.

Knox believes that the public response exhibited a double standard sex workers face from those who seek their services. In February 2014 Knox gave an interview to the campus newspaper, The Chronicle, in which she used the pseudonym "Lauren A.", and referred to her stage name as "Aurora" to avoid identifying herself. She expressed frustration over her treatment stating, "I feel like girls at Duke have to hide their sexuality. We're caught in this virgin-whore dichotomy."  Knox published a similar defense on lifestyle website xoJane, but the storm of harassment continued.  Knox's identity, contact information, and location were posted, but when Knox contacted the police over the ongoing threats, the police failed to respect her concerns.

On March 4, 2014, Knox decided to embrace her new reality: she wrote a second post where she revealed her stage name, and reflected on her experiences.  She would later summarize her reasoning as: "I think the [sex-work] industry needs a feminist advocate as well."

Response 
Media outlets covering the story uniformly described the public response as slut-shaming.  The Poynter Institute's Kelly McBride commented on the reception for Knox's story, stating that it "[presented] a lesson in crowd behavior", noting that, "While her critics were loud and destructive, advocating that people call her dad to let him know his daughter is a porn star, no one suggested a phone campaign to inform the mother of the frat boy who outed her that her son is watching porn."  According to critic and former sex worker Eric Barry, "It's impossible to separate those trying to violate sex workers' right to privacy, from those who believe sex workers somehow deserve to be devalued." Elizabeth Stoker, in The Week, noted the "reprehensible and personal" comments of threats and harassment through social media were "odious and inexcusable", and characterized them as unjustifiable, as well as being "disproportionately aimed at women in the public sphere".

At the same time, not all commentators agreed with Knox on how to interpret her decisions.  Stoker found Knox's political agenda uncompelling, because it emphasizes personal freedom over quality of life.  The sex industry does not have a trade union, and marketing towards male sexual desire incentivizes unsafe practices in the industry.  John Rogove believes that the sex industry actually reduces freedom, by transforming its actors from people into commodities.  Eliana Dockterman, writing for Time, doubted that Knox could truly find her pornography career empowering.  According to Dockterman, Knox "doesn't know how to process her newfound fame" and her decision "will likely haunt [her] for the rest of her college and professional career."

A representative for Duke University issued a statement saying that while they would not comment on specific cases, the college's community standard did not have any restrictions concerning off-campus employment. Of Knox's allegations that campus police did not take the threats against her seriously enough, the representative remarked, "We are committed to protecting the privacy, safety and security of our students. Whenever we identify a student in need of support, we reach out to them and offer the many resources that we have available on campus to assist them."

Media appearances and dramatizations 
In May 2014, Knox announced that she would be hosting an online show called The Sex Factor along with four other porn performers, where they would oversee 16 contestants that would compete for the right to participate in a sex scene with Knox. In February 2015, Asa Akira replaced Knox as the show's host.

A fictionalized version of Knox's story was featured in "Pornstar's Requiem", an episode of Law & Order: Special Victims Unit.  Knox has also been the focus of the five-part documentary series Becoming Belle Knox, which was produced and released by Stateless Media and Conde Nast Entertainment. In 2015, she narrated on a one-hour episode of "One Bad Choice" on MTV, also showing a dramatized version of her life.  A TV docudrama based on her life titled From Straight A's to XXX premiered on the Lifetime network in February 2017.

Personal life
Knox is half Canadian and half Punjabi Indian. As of 2014, Knox was pursuing a major in women's studies and sociology and is now a women's rights activist. She identifies as bisexual.

Awards and nominations

References

Further reading

External links

 
 
 
 Archive at HuffPost

1995 births
Living people
Actresses from San Antonio
American libertarians
American people of Canadian descent
American people of Punjabi descent
American pornographic film actresses
American pornographic film actors of Indian descent
American women columnists
Bisexual feminists
Bisexual pornographic film actresses
College Republicans
Duke University alumni
HuffPost writers and columnists
American LGBT people of Asian descent
North Carolina Republicans
Sex-positive feminists
21st-century American women